Cairo is a 1942 musical comedy film made by MGM and Loew's, and directed by W. S. Van Dyke. The screenplay was written by John McClain, based on an idea by Ladislas Fodor about a news reporter shipwrecked in a torpedo attack, who teams up with a Hollywood singer and her maid to foil Nazi spies.  The music score is by Herbert Stothart. This film was Jeanette MacDonald's last film on her MGM contract.

The film was poorly received upon its initial release.

Plot

American Homer Smith is the star reporter of a small newspaper, which is named the best small town newspaper in the country. As a reward for his contributions, he is sent to North Africa to report on the war. In the Mediterranean, however, his ship is sunk; he and one other survivor, Philo Cobson, make it to shore. Cobson reveals that he is a member of British Intelligence and asks Smith to give a coded message to a Mrs. Morrison in Cairo.

Mrs. Morrison tells him that motion picture star Marcia Warren is a Nazi spy. Smith, a big fan of Warren, has trouble believing it, but finds Warren's behavior suspect. He gets a job as her butler as Juniper Jones. Meanwhile, the innocent Warren begins to think that Smith is an enemy agent. Despite their mutual suspicions, they start to fall in love. Eventually, the real spies are unmasked: Cobson and Mrs. Morrison.

Cast

 Jeanette MacDonald as Marcia Warren
 Robert Young as Homer Smith, aka Juniper Jones
 Ethel Waters as Cleona Jones, Marcia's Maid
 Reginald Owen as Philo Cobson
 Grant Mitchell as Mr. O.H.P. Boggs
 Lionel Atwill as Teutonic gentleman
 Eduardo Ciannelli as Ahmed Ben Hassan
 Mitchell Lewis as Ludwig
 Dooley Wilson as Hector
 Larry Nunn as Bernie
 Dennis Hoey as Col. Woodhue
 Mona Barrie as Mrs. Morrison
 Rhys Williams as Strange man
 Cecil Cunningham as Mme. Laruga
 Harry Worth as Viceroy Hotel bartender
 Frank Richards as Alfred
 Faten Hamama as Amina

Reception
According to MGM records. the film earned $616,000 in the U.S. and Canada and $581,000 elsewhere, meaning the studio recorded a profit of $273,000.

References

External links
 
 
 
 
 

1942 films
1942 musical comedy films
1942 romantic comedy films
American musical comedy films
American romantic comedy films
American romantic musical films
American spy comedy films
American black-and-white films
Films about journalists
Films directed by W. S. Van Dyke
Films scored by Herbert Stothart
Films produced by Joseph L. Mankiewicz
Films set in Cairo
Films set in Egypt
Metro-Goldwyn-Mayer films
1940s spy comedy films
World War II spy films
1940s romantic musical films
1940s American films